Adriano Herrerabarría (born December 28, 1928, Santiago de Veraguas, Veraguas Province, Panama) was a Panamanian painter and teacher. He graduated as an elementary school teacher from the Escuela Normal de Santiago, but he devoted himself to learning the art of mural painting and, in 1955, obtained a master's degree in fine arts at the Academy of San Carlos de la Universidad Nacional Autonoma de Mexico and a degree in teaching art at the Ecole Normale Superieure de Mexico.

Paintings

Group exhibitions 
The Tlacuhilos Gallery - Mexico, DF (1955)
The Biennale of America - Palacio de Bellas Artes - Mexico City (1958)
XVI Biennial of São Paulo - Brazil (1979)
Panama and Brazil meet. Atlapa - Panama (1982)

Individual exhibitions 
University of Panama - Panama (1959)
Mariano Picon Salas Gallery - Caracas, Venezuela (1964)
House of the Journalist - Panama (1966)
Military Circle building - Caracas, Venezuela (1967)
Caming House - London, UK (1971)
Gallery of the Savings Bank - Panama (1973)

External links 
 Biografía en la Biblioteca Nacional de Panamá
 Adriano Herrerabarría, Panama America Editorial
 Note in Panama Skylight

1928 births
Panamanian painters
Living people
Panamanian expatriates in Mexico